Jett Pangan (born Reginald Pangan on June 21, 1968) is a Filipino actor, singer and guitarist best known for fronting the Filipino rock bands the Dawn, and the now defunct Jett Pangan Group. He is also an actor, appearing in several theater plays, TV, and films, most notably his role in Tulad ng Dati and his lead role in the musical production of Sweeney Todd.

The Dawn (1985–1995, 1999–present)
Pangan's love for singing was already evident during his grade school and high school years in San Beda College. While attending college at De La Salle University-Manila, he was approached to audition for a band that would later become one of the most successful rock bands in the Philippines, the Dawn.

After the disbandment of the Dawn in 1995, the band would later on hold a sold-out reunion concert at the ULTRA basketball stadium in 1997, an event that didn't prove to be the spark that would ignite a re-grouping. However, in 1999, the band members were unanimous in taking the Dawn back on the road.

Solo work and Jett Pangan Group (1995–2001)
When the Dawn disbanded in 1995, Pangan moved on to work as a recording company executive and was later persuaded to release the solo album, Spell. Not long after, the Jett Pangan Group was formed and successfully released two albums.

They disbanded in 2001 with Pangan continuing to perform with the Dawn.

Theater Arts
In between touring and recording, Pangan finds time to act in musical theater. In 2001, his first musical theater involvement was in the rock opera Jesus Christ Superstar together with fellow musicians Rico Blanco and Noel Cabangon. He was also involved in local productions of Jekyll and Hyde and Nine. He would later play the lead role in an international musical production of Stephen Soundheim's Sweeney Todd: The Demon Barber of Fleet Street in 2019 alongside actress/singer Lea Salonga.

Anime roles
BECK: Mongolian Chop Squad as Saitou Ken’ichi
Voltes V as Draco

Hosting
He was host for the program Myx Live (replacing Bernard Palanca and Rico Blanco).

Filmography/Television
Myx Live as Host (myx)
Tulad ng Dati as himself (2006)
Paano Kita Iibigin as Mon (2007)
Halik sa Hangin as Rene (2015)
The Breakup Playlist as Lester (2015)
FPJ's Ang Probinsyano as Edson Lee (ABS-CBN, 2015)
Born for You as Marcus (ABS-CBN, 2016)
Hahamakin ang Lahat as Charlie Ke (GMA Network, 2016-2017)
Wildflower as Gov. Willam Alvarez (ABS-CBN, 2017)
 Ipaglaban Mo: Sumpaan as Orly (ABS-CBN, 2018)
Babawiin Ko ang Lahat as Akira Tanaka (GMA Network, 2021)
Marry Me, Marry You as Myke Jacinto (Kapamilya Channel, 2021-2022)
Flower of Evil as Gerry Payumo (Viu, Kapamilya Channel, 2022)
Lyric and Beat as Peter (iWantTFC, 2022)

Discography
The Dawn
The Dawn (1986) 
I Stand with You (1988)
Beyond the Bend (1989)
Heart's Thunder (1990)
Abot Kamay (1992)
Puno't Dulo (1994) 
Prodigal Sun (2000)
Harapin (2004) 
Tulad ng Dati (2006) 
The Later Half of Day (2008)
Sound the Alarm (2009)
Ascendant (2018)

As solo artist
Spell (1995)

Jett Pangan Group
The Jett Pangan Group (1998)
Daylight (1999)

See also
The Dawn
Pinoy rock

References

External links
The Dawn Official Website

1968 births
Filipino male voice actors
Living people
20th-century Filipino male singers
21st-century Filipino male singers
Filipino television personalities
VJs (media personalities)
Musicians from Manila
De La Salle University alumni